Live från Rondo was released on 14 February 2003 and is an album from singer trio Kikki Danielsson, Elisabeth Andreassen och Lotta Engberg, who then sang together as Kikki, Bettan & Lotta. CD 1 is a live record, where the recording is from Rondo in Gothenburg, Sweden on 11 December 2002. CD 2 is a studio record. The album peaked at number 18 on the Swedish Albums Chart.

Track listing

CD 1 (Live från Rondo)
God afton
Intåg
Åh vad jag älskade dig just då - Lotta
Papaya Coconut - Kikki
Danse mot vår - Bettan
Country-medley
9 to 5 - Kikki
Man, I feel Like a Woman - Bettan
Take Me Home Country Road - Lotta
One Dance, One Rose, One Kiss - Bettan & Lotta
Stand by Your Man - Kikki
Så länge skutan kan gå - Bettan
Feels Like Home
Juliette & Jonathan - Lotta
Killarna i mitt band
Amazing Grace - Kikki
Hit-parad
Dag efter dag - Bettan & Kikki
Kär och galen - Lotta
Miss Decibel - Kikki
Då lyser en sol - Bettan
Having a Party
100%
Dag efter dag
Vem é dé du vill ha
Schlager-medley
Fyra Bugg & en Coca Cola - Lotta
Bra vibrationer - Kikki
La det swinge - Bettan
Sångerna som för oss tätt tillsammans

CD 2 (bonus-CD)
Fri - Kikki
Danse mot vår - Bettan
Håll om mig nu - Lotta
Han pendlar varje dag (Morning Train) - Bettan
Rör vid mig - Kikki
Tennessee Waltz - Lotta
En enda morgon (Angel of the Morning) - Bettan
Easy Come, Easy Go - Kikki
Sången han sjöng var min egen - Lotta
Så skimrande var aldrig havet - Bettan
Nära dig - Kikki
Brevet från Maria på Öland - Lotta
Lämna mig inte - Kikki
Lipstick on Your Collar - Bettan
Jag har börjat leva nu - Kikki
Having a Party - Chips

Contributing musicians
Leif Ottebrand - Kapellmeister, arrangements and keyboards
Henrik Gad - Saxophone
Håkan Glänte - Keyboards and choir
Peter Johansson - Trombone
Mats Johansson - Guitar
Per Strandberg - Bass and choir
Miko Rezler - drums

Charts

References 

2003 compilation albums
2003 live albums
Kikki, Bettan & Lotta compilation albums
Swedish-language compilation albums
Swedish-language live albums
Kikki, Bettan & Lotta live albums
Mariann Grammofon live albums
Mariann Grammofon compilation albums